Paul G. Mahoney (born 1959) is an American law professor who worked as the dean of the University of Virginia School of Law from July 1, 2008 to July 1, 2016. He succeeded John Calvin Jeffries as Dean, and was succeeded by Risa L. Goluboff.

Education 
Mahoney earned a Bachelor of Science degree in electrical engineering from the Massachusetts Institute of Technology in 1981 and a Juris Doctor from Yale Law School in 1984.

Career 
Mahoney clerked for Judge Ralph K. Winter Jr. of the United States Court of Appeals for the Second Circuit and for United States Supreme Court Justice Thurgood Marshall. He practiced law at Sullivan & Cromwell from 1986 until 1990, when he joined the Virginia law faculty. His areas of academic interest are securities regulation, law and economic development, corporate finance, financial derivatives and contracts.

Mahoney is a member of the Council on Foreign Relations, and was an associate editor of the Journal of Economic Perspectives and a director of the American Law and Economics Association.

See also 
 List of law clerks of the Supreme Court of the United States (Seat 10)

References

Living people
1959 births
Law clerks of the Supreme Court of the United States
American legal scholars
University of Virginia School of Law faculty
Massachusetts Institute of Technology alumni
Yale Law School alumni
Scholars of securities law
Sullivan & Cromwell people